Woodwardia is a genus of ferns in the family Blechnaceae, in the suborder Aspleniineae (eupolypods II) of the order Polypodiales. Species are known as chain ferns. The genus is native to warm temperate and subtropical regions of the Northern Hemisphere. They are large ferns, with fronds growing to 50–300 cm long depending on the species. The fossil record of the genus extends to the Paleocene.

Taxonomy
Woodwardia was first described by James Edward Smith in 1793. It was named after Thomas Jenkinson Woodward. When broadly circumscribed, the genus contains about 15 species (plus some hybrids). In the Pteridophyte Phylogeny Group classification of 2016 (PPG I), the genera Anchistea and Lorinseria (each with one species) are kept separate.

Species
, Plants of the World Online accepts the following species, excluding those placed in other genera in the PPG I system.
Woodwardia auriculata Blume
Woodwardia fimbriata Sm.
Woodwardia harlandii Hook.
Woodwardia intermedia Christ
Woodwardia japonica (L.f.) Sm.
Woodwardia kempii Copel.
Woodwardia magnifica Ching & P.S.Chiu
Woodwardia martinezii Maxon ex Weath.
Woodwardia orientalis (Sw.) Sw.
Woodwardia prolifera Hook. & Arn.
Woodwardia radicans (L.) Sm.
Woodwardia spinulosa M.Martens & Galeotti
Woodwardia unigemmata (Makino) Nakai

Species placed elsewhere in PPG I are:
Woodwardia areolata (L.) T.Moore = Lorinseria areolata (L.) C.Presl 
Woodwardia virginica (L.) Sm. = Anchistea virginica (L.) C.Presl

References

External links
Germplasm Resources Information Network: Woodwardia
Flora of North America: Woodwardia
Flora of China: Woodwardia species list
Smith's original description of the genus online at Project Gutenberg
Huxley, A., ed. (1992). New RHS Dictionary of Gardening. Macmillan.

Blechnaceae
Fern genera